Official relations between Poland and the Palestine Liberation Organization (PLO) date back to the 1970s, when a PLO representative office was opened in 1976.

Diplomatic relations between Poland and the PLO began in 1982, when the representative office was appointed as the official diplomatic mission to Poland and the head of the mission was appointed ambassador.

Poland recognized the Palestinian Declaration of Independence issued by the Palestinian National Council in Algiers in 1988 and raised the degree of Palestinian representation to the level of an embassy with all privileges and rights enjoyed by other missions accredited to Poland. Poland accepted that the Ambassador of the State of Palestine be the extraordinary ambassador to Poland since 2000.

The Polish position is consistent in its support for the struggle of the Palestinian people. Poland is one of the European countries that support the resolution of the Palestinian-Israeli conflict peacefully based on the two-state solution. There is parliamentary cooperation between Palestine and Poland and the exchange of parliamentary delegations. There is also close cooperation in various fields such as tourism, education, sports and military security. Poland provides annual support through aid for development projects in Palestine. Since 2006, Poland has been providing support in education, health care, and humanitarian aid to Palestinian refugees via UNRWA.

Poland participated in the training of a number of Palestinian diplomats, policemen and border guards. The Polish border guards trained 72 Palestinian policemen in 2016.

Poland's abstention in favor of a General Assembly resolution rejecting any measures to change the situation in Jerusalem stems from the Polish view that voting in favor of the resolution will not bring the solution between the two sides closer. In October 2021, the Polish ambassador to Palestine confirmed that the relations between the two countries were at their best stage and that there were further efforts to strengthen them at multiple levels.

To help fight the COVID-19 pandemic in Palestine, Poland in cooperation with Polish Caritas donated medical equipment in December 2020. In February 2022, Poland donated 300,000 COVID-19 vaccines to Palestine.

In July 2022, a Polish parliamentary delegation visited Palestine and paid tribute to the late President Yasser Arafat. They also described Israel as an apartheid state.

References 

Poland
Palestine
State of Palestine–Poland relations